Everett Leon Murray (born January 10, 1977) is a former American football quarterback of the Arena Football League, and is a college football coach.  Murray attended Tennessee State University.  In 2001 Murray was the backup quarterback on the Berlin Thunder team that won World Bowl IX. Murray is currently the quarterbacks coach at Morehouse College in Atlanta, Georgia.

1977 births
Living people
American football quarterbacks
Tennessee State Tigers football players
Berlin Thunder players
Edmonton Elks players
Georgia Force players
Nashville Kats players
New York Dragons players
Philadelphia Soul players
Players of American football from Cincinnati
Orlando Rage players